Isaiah the Serb was a Serbian Orthodox hieromonk and composer of chants who flourished in the second half of the 15th century. Along with Kir Joakim, Kir Stefan the Serb, Nikola the Serb he faithfully followed Byzantine musical tradition, writing in the late kalophonic style of the 14th and 15th centuries.

Life and works
Isaiah worked in the Matejče Monastery, near Kumanovo (in modern North Macedonia). He was a prolific author of acolouthias (in Old Church Slavonic послѣдованиѥ). Each acolouthia was an anthology of liturgical chants and psalm settings, both his own and others'. Isaiah was a very well-educated composer of both bilingual and purely Greek hymns.  His masterpiece, Serbian Polyeleos, appears in two manuscripts, one version with a Serbian recension of the text, the other with a Greek. The existence of Greek and Slavonic settings in his works shows that Serbian services were commonly bilingual. He was also the author of the bilingual Trisagion. Many of his works are short syllabic hymns honouring the Serbian saints.

Isaiah's melodies, some syllabic, others more melismatic, show his inventiveness, and his ability to introduce new and original elements, especially from the Serbian tradition, within the compositional framework of the Byzantine chant, thus creating a new and distinctive style: the Serbo-Byzantine school. His works represent two thirds of preserved Serbian Medieval music. He was also immensely popular after his death, with his compositions being copied until the late 18th century. His works are also included in the Anthologion 928 from the National Library of Greece, Athens.

Partial list of works
Bilingual Trisagion
Greek Trisagion
Serbian Polyeleos, one Greek and one Serbian version
Christos Anesti ("Christ is Risen"), a Paschal troparion
Ѱаломникь’
Four different 
Въскликнѣте Богови
КрьстȢ ТвоемȢ
Прїидѣте Въси Землънородны

See also
John Koukouzelis
Music of Serbia
Music of Old Serbia
Kir Joakim
Kir Stefan the Serb
Nikola the Serb

References

15th-century Serbian people
Christian hymnwriters
Medieval Serbian Orthodox clergy
Serbian composers
15th-century composers
15th-century Eastern Orthodox clergy
Serbian monks
15th-century Christian monks